Wolfgang Sauseng (born Graz, July 6, 1956) is an Austrian composer, conductor and organist.

Discography
 Sauseng: ...in grünen Stein geschlossen; Mondgott

References

Austrian organists
Male organists
Male conductors (music)
Austrian male composers
Austrian composers
1956 births
Musicians from Graz
Living people
21st-century Austrian conductors (music)
21st-century organists
21st-century male musicians